North Casino is a civil parish of Rous County in the Northern Rivers Region of New South Wales. 

The civil parish is between Richmond River and Back Creek, a tributary of the Wilsons River. The North Coast railway line, New South Wales runs to the west of North Casino and the branch line to Lismore, New South Wales passes through the parish.

Parishes of Rous County